Yasmine Hamdan (born 1976) is a Lebanese singer and songwriter, now based in Paris.

Biography

Hamdan became known with Soapkills, the duo she founded with Zeid Hamdan (no relation) while she was still living in Beirut, Lebanon. The first album released by Soapkills was  Bater (1999). Soapkills was one of the first independent electronic bands in the Middle East, and its innovative approach exerted a lasting influence. To this day, Yasmine Hamdan is considered an icon of underground music across the Arab world.

After moving to Paris, Hamdan collaborated with CocoRosie. She teamed up with Mirwais (who was part of French electronic new wave band Taxi Girl in the 80s, and produced/co-wrote some of Madonna's albums), with whom she recorded the Arabology album (2008), under the Y.A.S. moniker.

Hamdan then joined forces with Marc Collin (of Nouvelle Vague) to write and produce her first, self-titled solo album, which came out in France and Lebanon in 2012 on Kwaidan Records), and was released internationally (in a revised version with five new tracks) in 2013 by Crammed Discs under the title Ya Nass. In this album, which blends pop, folk and electronic sounds with melodies and lyrics inspired by various Middle-Eastern traditions, Hamdan "has undertaken the challenge of affirming and rewriting Arabic musical heritage", according to the Al-Akhbar paper. Her personal life (she has lived in Lebanon, Kuwait, Abu Dhabi, Greece and France) and her curiosity have enabled Hamdan to playfully use various dialects of Arabic in her lyrics, which alternate between Lebanese, Kuwaiti, Palestinian, Egyptian and Bedouin, as well as some of the code-switching which is so typical of Middle-Eastern humour.

Hamdan had a cameo in Jim Jarmusch's film Only Lovers Left Alive alongside Tilda Swinton and Tom Hiddleston. She has written an original soundtrack for the theatre play Rituel pour une métamorphose by Syrian playwright Saadallah Wannous for a production at Comédie Française.

Entitled Al Jamilat ('The Beautiful Ones'), Yasmine Hamdan's second solo album came out in 2017. Recorded in Beirut, Paris and London, it was produced by herself, co-produced by Leo Abrahams and Luke Smith, and features performances by Shahzad Ismaily, Steve Shelley and more. An album of reworks by the likes of Acid Arab, Matias Aguayo, Brandt Brauer Frick and several others came out in 2018 (Jamilat Reprise).

Yasmine Hamdan is married to the Palestinian film director and actor Elia Suleiman and lives in Paris.

Discography
with Soap Kills
 Bater (1999)
 Cheftak (2001)
 Enta Fen (2005)

with Y.A.S.

 Arabology (2009)

Solo recordings
 Ya Nass (2013) (originally given a limited release in 2012 as Yasmine Hamdan)
 Al Jamilat (2017)
 Jamilat Reprise (2018)

Film music
2016: In Between by Maysaloun Hamoud
2013: Only Lovers Left Alive by Jim Jarmusch
2009: The Time That Remains by Elia Suleiman
2006: What a Wonderful World by Faouzi Bensaidi
2005: A Perfect Day by K.Jreij and Joana Hadjithomas
2003: Cendres by K.Jreij and Joana Hadjithomas
2002: Aux Frontière by D.Arbid, documentaire (ARTE, RTBF, CBF)
2002: Intervention Divine by Elia Suleiman
2002: Terra Incognita by Ghassan Salhab, Cannes 2002

References

External links

Yasmine Hamdan page on the Crammed Discs website
Yasmine Hamdan at Farklı Müzik

1976 births
Living people
Lebanese emigrants to France
Trip hop musicians
21st-century Lebanese women singers
Ipecac Recordings artists
21st-century French women singers
French folk-pop singers
20th-century Lebanese women singers